

Events
In 1955, the bosses of the Acquasanta Mafia clan, Gaetano Galatolo and Nicola D’Alessandro were killed in a dispute over the protection rackets when the Palermo fruit and vegetable wholesale market moved from the Zisa area to Acquasanta, disturbing the delicate power balances within Cosa Nostra. The killer of Galatolo was never identified, but Michele Cavataio was suspected. Cavataio became the new boss of the clan and had to agree to split the profits of the wholesale market racket with the Greco Mafia clan of Ciaculli, who traditionally controlled fruit and vegetable supply to Palermo wholesale market.
March 31 – Stefano Bedami, New Jersey Family Boss is stabbed to death in a Newark, New Jersey restaurant.
Nicolo Impastato, a Sicilian mafiosi and drug trafficker, is deported to Italy by the Mexican government. 
August 25 – Meyer Lansky's Casino Internacional, the earliest of Havana's syndicate casinos, is taken over by Moe Dalitz and Sam Tucker. It would eventually be sold to Mike McLaney, only six months before the Cuban Revolution and seized by the Castro regime.
November 4 - Willie Bioff, a former pimp, labor racketeer and Chicago Outfit associate who had testified against his fellow conspirators in the extortion of Hollywood movie studios in the 1930s and early 1940s, is killed when a bomb planted on his pickup truck explodes outside his home in Phoenix, Arizona.  Bioff, who had been living under an assumed name, had recently begun working at the Outfit-controlled Riviera Casino in Las Vegas, which tipped off the Outfit mobsters as to his whereabouts.

Arts and literature

Births

Deaths
May 30 - Louis Campagna, "Little New York" Chicago Outfit member
November 4 - Willie Bioff, former Chicago Outfit associate

References

Organized crime
Years in organized crime